Terry Orndorff (born October 7, 1951) is an American retired professional wrestler. He is the younger brother of the late professional wrestler and WWE Hall of Famer "Mr. Wonderful" Paul Orndorff.

Professional wrestling career 
Orndorff debuted in late 1978. He spent the early part of his career wrestling primarily in Tennessee for Georgia Championship Wrestling and Southeastern Championship Wrestling, regularly teaming with his brother Paul.

Throughout 1980, Orndorff wrestled for the Oklahoma-based Mid-South Wrestling promotion, where again he occasionally teamed with his brother Paul. In September 1980, he and Junkyard Dog defeated The Fabulous Freebirds for the Mid-South Tag Team Championship. They lost the titles to Ernie Ladd and Leroy Brown the following month. Oliver later turned on Junkyard Dog; the two men went on to feud, with Orndorff losing a match that obligated him to wear a "yellow mask" for 60 days. In January 1981, Orndorff teamed with Chief Frank Hill to win the vacant NWA Tri-State Tag Team Championship; the titles were held up in February following a bout against Akbar's Army (Jerry Brown and Ron McFarlane), with Akbar's Army winning the titles in a follow-up match. In July 1981, Orndorff lost to Junkyard Dog in a lights out match in the main event of a show in the Louisiana Superdome.	

In autumn 1981, Orndorff briefly moved to the Texas-based Big Time Wrestling promotion.	In October 1981 at Wrestling Star Wars, he teamed with Kerry Von Erich as a substitute for Kevin Von Erich to win the NWA World Tag Team Championship (Texas version), defeating Chan Chung and The Great Kabuki. Orndorff returned to Mid-South Wrestling the following month after a disagreement with Big Time Wrestling promoter Fritz Von Erich; the titles were awarded to Bill Irwin and Frank Dusek. He finished 1981 by resuming his feud with Junkyard Dog.

In 1982, Orndorff wrestled for the St. Louis Wrestling Club in St. Louis, Missouri. He retired in the same year after being injured in a car accident, returning to his trade as a boilermaker.

Professional wrestling style and persona 
Orndorff's finishing move was the airplane spin.

Championships and accomplishments 
Big Time Wrestling
NWA World Tag Team Championship (Texas version) (1 time) – with Kerry Von Erich
Mid-South Wrestling
Mid-South Tag Team Championship (1 time) – with Junkyard Dog
NWA Tri-State Tag Team Championship (1 time) – with Chief Frank Hill

References

External links 
 

American boilermakers
American male professional wrestlers
Living people
People from Winchester, Virginia
Professional wrestlers from Virginia
1951 births